Norway was represented by Finn Kalvik, with the song "Aldri i livet", at the 1981 Eurovision Song Contest, which took place on 4 April in Dublin. "Aldri i livet" was chosen as the Norwegian entry at the Melodi Grand Prix on 7 March.

Before Eurovision

Melodi Grand Prix 1981 
The Melodi Grand Prix 1981 was held at the studios of broadcaster NRK in Oslo, hosted by the previous year's Norwegian performer Sverre Kjelsberg. Ten songs took part in the final, with the winner chosen by a 9-member jury, two of whose members were Ellen Nikolaysen, who represented Norway in 1973 (as a member of the Bendik Singers) and 1975, and Anita Skorgan, who represented Norway in 1979, who awarded 10 points to their favourite song down to 1 point to the least-liked.

At Eurovision 
On the night of the final Kalvik performed 13th in the running order, following Ireland and preceding the United Kingdom – in one of Eurovision's stranger coincidences, this was to be the first of six consecutive contests in which Norway was drawn to perform immediately before the United Kingdom. Kalvik performed the low-key ballad seated and strumming a guitar, and it was surmised that the song may have suffered by being sandwiched between the Irish and British entries, both of which were uptempo, instantly catchy pop songs with eye-catching stage presentations. "Aldri i livet" got totally lost, and at the close of voting had failed register any score, giving Norway a second nul-points in four contests and a sixth time at the foot of the scoreboard. The Norwegian jury awarded its 12 points to Switzerland.

Voting 
Norway did not receive any points at the 1981 Eurovision Song Contest.

References

External links 
Full national final on nrk.no

1981
Countries in the Eurovision Song Contest 1981
1981
Eurovision
Eurovision